is a railway station in Miyazaki City, Miyazaki Prefecture, Japan.

Lines

Layout 
The station, which is unstaffed, consists of an island platform serving two tracks. The station building is simple functional prefabricated structure which houses a waiting area, a SUGOCA card reader and a toilet. Access to the island platform is by means of a footbridge.

Adjacent stations

History
Japanese National Railways (JNR) opened the facility as the Hyūga-Kutsukake signal box on 15 September 1965. It was upgraded to a full station on 1 October 1965, two weeks later. With the privatization of JNR on 1 April 1987, the station came under the control of JR Kyushu.

Passenger statistics
In fiscal 2016, the station was used by an average of 85 passengers (boarding only) per day.

See also
List of railway stations in Japan

References

External links
Hyūga-Kutsukake (JR Kyushu)

Railway stations in Miyazaki Prefecture
Railway stations in Japan opened in 1965